Saint-Lumine-de-Clisson (literally Saint-Lumine of Clisson) is a commune in the Loire-Atlantique department in western France.

International relations

Saint-Lumine-de-Clisson is twinned with:
  Alatri in Italy

See also
Communes of the Loire-Atlantique department

References

Saintluminedeclisson